C. Sivakumar is an Indian politician who is a Member of Legislative Assembly of Tamil Nadu. He was elected from Mailam as an Pattali Makkal Katchi candidate in 2021.

Elections contested

References 

Tamil Nadu MLAs 2021–2026
Living people
Pattali Makkal Katchi politicians
Tamil Nadu politicians
Year of birth missing (living people)